Below is a list of museums in the Comoros.

List
 National Museum of Comoros

See also
 List of museums

External links
 Museums in Comoros

Comoros
Lists of buildings and structures in the Comoros
Lists of organizations based in the Comoros
Comoros education-related lists
Comoros